Gagarinite-(Ce) previously zajacite-(Ce) is a rare radioactive fluoride mineral with formula Na(REExCa1−x)(REEyCa1−y)F6. REE refers to rare-earth elements, mostly those belonging to the lanthanide series. It crystallizes in the trigonal rhombohedral system and has a white vitreous appearance with a conchoidal fracture. It has a Mohs hardness of 3.5 and a specific gravity of 4.44 to 4.55. Zajacite is transparent with refractive indices nω = 1.483 and nε = 1.503.  Gagarinite-(Y) is a yttrium-rich analog.

It occurs as creamy to white anhedral to subhedral grains in pegmatite and aplite pods or lenses in a peralkaline igneous intrusion.

It was discovered in 1993 at Strange Lake, Quebec – Labrador, (56°20'N, 64°10'W) and was initially named for Ihor Stephan Zajac, who led the expedition responsible for its discovery, and who first recognized the presence of the new mineral. The mineral was renamed gagarinite-(Ce) in 2010 by the IMA. The new name is for Russian cosmonaut Yuri Gagarin (1934–1968).

See also
List of minerals
List of minerals named after people

References

Lanthanide minerals
Sodium minerals
Calcium minerals
Fluorine minerals
Trigonal minerals
Minerals in space group 147